The Whales of August is a 1987 American drama film directed by Lindsay Anderson and starring Bette Davis and Lillian Gish as elderly sisters. Also in the cast were Ann Sothern as one of their friends, and  Vincent Price as a peripheral member of the former Russian aristocracy. The story is based on the play of the same title by David Berry.

The film was shot on location on Maine's Cliff Island. The house still stands and is a popular subject of artists on the island. Ann Sothern earned a Best Supporting Actress nomination at the 60th Academy Awards.

Plot
The Whales of August tells the story of two elderly widowed sisters from Philadelphia, near the end of their lives, spending their annual summer in a seaside house in Maine. The surroundings cause them to recall their relationship as young women, and the summers they had enjoyed there in the past.  They reflect on the passage of time, and the bitterness, jealousies and misunderstandings that slowly festered over the years and kept them from establishing a true closeness in their relationship.

Libby, played by Davis, is the more infirm of the two sisters, and her nature has become bitter and cold as a result.  Sarah, played by Gish, is a softer and more tolerant character, intent on nursing her sister through her discomfort and trying to breach the gulf that has grown between them. The resentment that Libby so clearly displays to her stifles Sarah's every attempt at making a friendly overture towards her, and Sarah cautiously retreats from her.

Maranov (Price) is an expatriate from Russia who has recently lost the friend with whom he had been living. Tisha (Sothern) is a vivacious lifelong friend who provides common sense, fun and laughter, and is the catalyst for some of the sisters' conversations and revelations.  In prologue, actresses Margaret Ladd, Mary Steenburgen and Tisha Sterling (Sothern's real-life daughter) play respectively Libby, Sarah, and Tisha as young women.

Cast

Production
The film's producer, Mike Kaplan, saw the play performed by the Trinity Repertory Company while he was visiting Rhode Island on family business. Kaplan, who had met Gish many years earlier when he was a publicist involved in The Comedians (1967), decided immediately that the role of Sarah Webber was a role that would introduce new generations of filmgoers to the great talent of the "First Lady of American Film", who had begun her film career in 1912. This was to be the final film role for the 93-year-old Gish; she died aged 99 in 1993. It was also to be Sothern's final acting role.

As opposed to the original stage production, the film made it possible to showcase stars who were the age peers of the characters. Actors and actresses of the appropriate age and stature were contacted to see whether they were both interested in and physically capable of playing the roles.  Many screen greats were approached to play a role but demurred because they suffered from various infirmities, including Shirley Booth, Barbara Stanwyck, Fred Astaire and Paul Henreid. Gish and Davis were both infirm: Davis had recently recovered from several strokes which inhibited movement on the left side of her body, and Gish was somewhat hard of hearing. Other greats turned down the producers' overtures for other reasons, including Joel McCrea, Frances Dee, Katharine Hepburn and John Gielgud. Even Davis and Gish turned down the parts more than once before being persuaded to star in the film.

This film marks a reunion between Davis and Vincent Price after 48 years, having last appeared on screen together in The Private Lives of Elizabeth and Essex in 1939.

Gish and Davis did not get along during the filming. Davis demanded top billing on the picture, of which Gish said, "Oh dear, I just can't deal with that sort of thing. I don't care what they do with my name. If they leave it off, so much the better. It's the work I love, not the glory." Davis got leftmost billing, which was considered optimal, with Gish's name slightly higher. Gish recalled that Davis rarely spoke to her or looked at her except when the script required. Though Gish was hurt, she was sympathetic due to Davis's illness. "That face! Have you ever seen such a tragic face? Poor woman! How she must be suffering! I don't think it's right to judge a person like that. We must bear and forbear." For her part, Davis was frustrated with Gish's missing her cues: "Miss Gish was stone deaf. She couldn’t have heard the cues if I’d shouted them through a bullhorn." However, Gish admitted she actually had little trouble hearing her cues, but invented a subtle version of the silent treatment due to Davis's mistreatment of her. When Davis spoke a line, Gish often would look puzzled and gently protest: "I just can't hear what she's saying." Whereupon, while Davis sat seething, Anderson would repeat Davis's line in a ringing voice, and Gish would instantly pick up her cue and continue the scene.

David Berry (the screenwriter), Lindsay Anderson (the director), the cinematographer, a location scout, and Kaplan traveled by water taxi to several islands in Casco Bay searching for a location that would provide the necessary ambiance and ocean vistas for the film. In the end, the film was shot on Cliff Island, a few miles from the site of Berry's family cottage on Peaks Island, where, in fact, the characters and story were drawn. The film's premiere in New York City on October 14, 1987, Gish's 94th birthday, was followed a few weeks later by a premiere in Portland, Maine, which was attended by both Berry and Kaplan.

Reception
Reviews for The Whales of August were mixed to positive. The plot and script were seen as underwhelming, with its major redeeming quality being the performances of Gish, Davis and Sothern. On Rotten Tomatoes out of 11 critics, 64% of them gave the film a positive review, with an average score of 6.63 out of 10. Roger Ebert of the Chicago Sun-Times gave the film 3 out of 4 stars.

Although the film starred two preeminent actresses in what was close to their final film roles, it was not a substantial commercial success domestically. Upon its release, it was widely tipped that either Davis or Gish would be rewarded, if not for their performances in this film then for their longevity, with Academy Award nominations, but neither actress was nominated. Sothern received the only Academy Award nomination of her career (and the film's sole nomination), for Best Supporting Actress, and Gish received the National Board of Review Award for Best Actress. The film was screened out of competition at the 1987 Cannes Film Festival, which Gish attended, and she got a 10-minute standing ovation.

The Japanese filmmaker Akira Kurosawa cited The Whales of August as one of his favorite films.

See also
Lillian Gish filmography
List of Vincent Price works
Bette Davis filmography

References

External links

Lillian Gish website article on the 1987 film

1987 films
1987 drama films
American drama films
1980s English-language films
Films about old age
Films about sisters
American films based on plays
Films directed by Lindsay Anderson
Films set in the 1950s
Films set in Maine
Films shot in Maine
1980s American films
Films about disability